Draheim is a surname. Notable people with the surname include:

Jeff Draheim (born 1963), American film editor
Sue Draheim (1949–2013), American fiddler
Tommie Draheim (born 1988), American football player
William Draheim (1898–1976), American politician